A mock trial is an act or imitation trial. It is similar to a moot court, but mock trials simulate lower-court trials, while moot court simulates appellate court hearings. Attorneys preparing for a real trial might use a mock trial consisting of volunteers as role players to test theories or experiment with each other.  Mock trial is also the name of an extracurricular program in which students participate in rehearsed trials to learn about the legal system in a competitive manner. Interscholastic mock trials take place on all levels including primary school, middle school, high school, college, and law school.  Mock trial is often taught in conjunction with a course in trial advocacy or takes place as an after school enrichment activity. Some gifted and talented programs may also take place in one.

Litigation related mock trials
Litigators may use mock trials to assist with trial preparation and settlement negotiations of actual cases. Unlike school-related mock trials, these mock trials can take numerous forms depending on the information sought. For example, when faced with complex fact issues in a particular case, attorneys might convene a mini mock trial to try different methods of presenting their evidence, sometimes before a jury.

Competitive school-related mock trials around the world

Asia Pacific
Guam has been hosting the annual Asia-Pacific Invitational Mock Trial Competition. In 2011 and 2012, there were 14 teams from Guam, South Korea, and Saipan in its 4th annual competition. The competition was held at the Superior Court of Guam. The teams made up of mostly junior and senior students from high schools. The Champion of the 4th Annual Asia-Pacific Invitational Mock Trial Competition was Marianas Baptist Academy of Saipan.

Australia
Mock trial competitions in Australia are held regionally. These include:
 The Law Society of South Australia Mock Trial Competition comprises a series of simulated court cases by students years 10, 11 and 12 from 32 schools in South Australia.
 The Law Society of Western Australia Interschool Mock Trial Competition is held each year for students enrolled in years 10, 11 and 12 in Western Australia. There were 773 students representing 68 teams from 38 schools participated in 2011.
 The Capital Region Mock Trial Competition is organized by University of Canberra. There were teams of schools in Australian Capital Territory region with year 10, 11 and 12 students.
 The New South Wales Mock Trial Competition has been running since 1981 for students years 10 and 11 in New South Wales initially with 28 schools. There have also been international events with mock trial competitions between Australia and the United Kingdom. In 2008, schools from this region also traveled to New York City to compete in the Empire Mock Trial Competition. The first Asia-Australia mock trial competition via video conference between Australian teams and a Korean team was held in 2009.

Continental Europe
Mock trials in continental Europe are less coordinated than their UK or US counterparts, but there are a few isolated examples. In Germany, the Faculty of Legal Sciences of the University of Regensburg organizes the REGINA Mock Trial. The University of Erlangen-Nuremberg organizes a mock trial specialized in administrative law. In Spain, there is a mock trial program specialized in insurance law coordinated by the Fundacion INADE-UDC Chair of Risk Management and Insurance.

United Kingdom
The Bar National Mock Trial Competition involves students to take on the roles of barristers and witnesses and present their case against teams from other schools. It has been running annually since 1991 with regional tournaments and the national final. There are 2,000 students in years 10 to 13, 300 barristers and advocates, and 90 judges involved in this competition.

The Magistrates Association of England and Wales organises a mock trial competition for junior and secondary-school age children, primarily aimed at promoting confidence in public speaking as well as introducing young people to the courts system.

The School Mock Court Case Project runs both primary and secondary school competitions primarily in Scotland, although has undertaken a number of international competitions. Currently some 100 schools, circa 3,000 students are involved. As of 2021, international schools started entering the programme, with over 16 countries taking part.

United States

Competition framework
Competitive mock trial functions in yearly cycles.  Each year, a case packet is distributed to all participating schools in late summer to early fall.  The case packet is a series of documents including the charges, penal code, stipulations, case law, and jury instructions as well as all exhibits and affidavits relevant to the case.  During a mock trial, competitors are restricted to only the materials provided in the case packet and may not reference any outside sources.  In order to prepare for competition, teams thoroughly read and analyze the case packet.

National mock trial teams consist of a minimum of six and a maximum of twelve official members.  The size of state mock trial teams can vary; California, for example, allows up to 25 official team members. Each team prepares both sides of the case:  prosecution/plaintiff and defense in a criminal trial, plaintiff and defense in a civil action.  Each side is composed of two or three attorneys as well as two or three witnesses, all played by members of the team. Teams must be organized into two sides of five to six players for the prosecution/plaintiff and defense. It is important to note that high school mock trial is governed by state bar associations, meaning that cases, rules, and competition structure vary from state to state whereas all of college mock trial is governed by the American Mock Trial Association, meaning that every school uses the same case and is subject to the same rules.

Procedure

The mock trial begins with the judge entering the courtroom. The judge then gives out the instructions to the jury (about what they are to listen to). Then if there is a pretrial motion, the defense and prosecution give their respective pretrial arguments. The judge then lets the prosecution or plaintiff give an opening statement. Following the prosecution/plaintiff's opening statement, the judge may offer the defense to deliver the opening statement during that time as well, or to wait until after the prosecution has presented all of its witnesses. After the opening statements, examination of the witnesses begins. The prosecution/plaintiff calls their witnesses first. Witnesses are sworn in by their team's bailiff/timekeeper. A student competitor attorney for the prosecution/plaintiff does a direct examination of the witness. Once the direct examination is complete, the opposing team may cross-examine the witness. After the cross-examination, if the first team chooses, they may re-direct the witness. Likewise, the other team may do a re-cross after a re-direct. However, re-direct and re-cross examinations are only limited to the scope of the previous examination conducted by opposing counsel. This process is repeated for the two remaining plaintiff witnesses. Once the prosecution/plaintiff have finished with their witnesses, the defense may give their opening statement if not delivered before, and then the process is repeated with the defense witnesses, having the defense attorneys direct and the plaintiff attorneys cross-examine.

Once all of the witnesses have been examined, the trial moves to closing arguments. The prosecutor/plaintiff again goes first and has the option to reserve time beforehand for rebuttal. After the defense finishes their closing argument, the plaintiff may give their rebuttal argument if they still have time remaining. In some competitions, the rebuttal is limited to the scope of the defense's closing argument. Time limits are set at each level of competition to prevent the trials from running too long and to keep rounds of competition running smoothly. Time limits are as follows:

Time limits may vary from state-to-state competitions. Please note that time is kept track of by the bailiff/timekeeper, who times their co-counsel's statements, examinations, and arguments. Time is stopped for objections.

Objections 
A main part of Mock Trial is the raising and arguing of objections given by opposing teams. Objections are raised when the opposing counsel attempts to bring in evidence or testimony that go against the rules of evidence. When an objection is raised, the judge may either overrule or sustain it immediately, or ask opposing counsel for their argument about why the testimony/evidence is admissible. Time is paused for objections, so an objection "battle" could theoretically go on for hours at a time until the judge makes a ruling. There is often an over all time limit given to rounds of competition, called "all loss" that prevent this from occurring. Mock Trial students receive an abridged version of Rules of Evidence to base their objections on in the case packet that contains the witness affidavits and other elements of the court case.

Judging

There are several different ways that a mock trial can be judged. In one, the judges for scoring the mock trial consist of the presiding judge and two scoring judges, all of whom score the teams. In a second method, there are two scoring judges and the presiding judge, as in the first method, but the presiding judge does not score the teams, rather the judge simply votes or casts a ballot for one team or another. In yet another method of judging, there are three scoring judges and the presiding judge is not involved in the scoring of the teams. Often at college invitationals, there are two scoring judges, one of whom doubles as the presiding judge. Since enticing attorneys to judge is notoriously difficult (as judges are rarely compensated with more than a free lunch), it is rare to see more than two judges in a round at most competitions.

Unlike real law, the victorious team does not necessarily have to win on the merits of the case. Instead, evaluators score individual attorneys and witnesses on a 1–10 scale (though some states use different scales for high school competitions) based on each stage of the trial. These consist of the opening statements for the plaintiff and defense, each of the witnesses’ testimony, direct and cross-examination by attorneys, and the closing statements for both sides. The team with the highest total number of points is often, but not always, the team that wins the judge's verdict. Given this method of scoring, it is possible for the defendant to be found guilty or lose the case but for the defense team to still win the round.

In some competitions, points can be deducted from a team's score for testifying with information outside the scope of the mock trial materials and for unsportsmanlike conduct or abuse of objections. However, scores are completely at a judge's discretion, meaning that scores are subjective based on different evaluation criteria.

Power matching
In the first round of the tournament, all of the teams are randomly matched to compete with each other. After the first round of some tournaments, teams are “power matched” to go up against other teams with similar records (e.g. in the second round, a 1–0 team will be matched with another 1–0 team). If there is a tie in record, the judges will use the number of ballots and total points earned to decide the matching. This allows for teams to compete with other teams of similar skill.

Of course, there are practical exceptions to the theory of power matching. Tab room coordinators who are creating brackets for each round may deviate from the rules of power matching in order to 1. allow each team to alternate between prosecution/plaintiff and defense between rounds, 2. avoid two teams from the same school competing against each other (Maryland Rule), 3. avoid having a team compete against a team it played in a prior round.

National championship format
In the national championship format, which is also employed by invitationals across the country, the tournament is power matched through the last round. While this determines the strongest team at the tournament overall, it does not provide an accurate representation of 2nd, 3rd, 4th place teams, etc., because they might have lost multiple ballots to a strong team who placed first.

Power protection
When tournaments are power protected, it means that the first rounds of competition are power matched as stated above. In the last round(s), however, the team with the strongest record is paired against the team with the weakest record. This ensures that the best teams do not knock each other out of the running for a rank. Rather, it's anticipated that the stronger team will win and protect their chance at a rank, while there is no harm done to the weaker team who is already out of reach of a trophy. Additionally, this method gives weaker teams exposure to stronger programs that they can learn from.

Levels of competition

Elementary school
At the elementary school level, the mock trial guide by American Bar Association suggests to use role-playing from scripted mock trials such as fairy tale mock trials as a way to introduce the concept of conflicts, trials, jury verdicts in civil trials, vocabulary of the court, damages, and the roles of individuals portrayed in the trial. Therefore, most of mock trials at this level are non-competitive classroom activities. There is no national competition for this level. However, a few states offer intrastate competitions. There are a couple of different formats for competitions at this level.

The first format focuses on how the cases are developed such as New Jersey Law Fair competitions. Students grades 3 to 6 are asked to generate, develop and write the case from their own idea to include details of the facts, issue, witnesses, statements, instructions, sub-issues, concepts and law. As the students at this age range may not know the details of applicable law, students are allowed to create their own law. There are no specific themes, students can choose any age-appropriate topics. The students are encouraged to do a role-playing in a mock trial based on the script that they have developed to involve other students in the classroom as juries in order to refine their case. Each team plays the roles of both side in their case during the mock trial. The winners will perform their case in the real court.

In North Carolina, the competition has a different format which focuses more on presentation skills. All teams are given the same case which has been written prior to the competition and students are asked to perform role-playing on the case. North Carolina Elementary School Mock Trial Competition uses the winning entries from New Jersey Law Fair in the prior year as the cases for students to perform.

Another format is to follow the standard format similar to the high school level but with less technical restriction. All teams are given the same material related to a case and prepare for the competition. Two teams compete in a live mock trial to represent two sides of the case. This format is used in the New Hampshire Bar Association's Mock Trial Competition. However, the first round of the competition is done by video submission where each team performs in both sides of the case. The qualified teams will be invited to the live competition with each team on each side of the case.

Middle school
Although there is no national competition for middle/junior high school level, there are many intrastate competitions held by state/county level organizers:

* With the exception of New Jersey, all competitions have similar format as in high school competitions with some rules relaxed. In New Jersey, the format is similar to the New Jersey Law Fair at the elementary school level with two specific themes that the teams can choose to develop their cases.

High school
The mock trial program was started to allow high school students to experience a courtroom setting in a variety of hands-on roles. The mock trials are set up and structured just like a real court and are bound by the same rules. This can help the students to know exactly what role each of the different people in a court (judges, lawyers, witnesses, etc.) do in the judicial system. High school competitions are even held in functional courtrooms in the local City Hall to lend additional authenticity to the trial, are presided over by real judges, and the competing teams are typically coached and scored by practicing attorneys. Cases typically have to do with problems faced by teens, and includes competitors as witnesses. Each year the case for pre-Nationals competitions alternates between a Civil case and a Criminal case. The cases are set up in such a way that the witnesses, defendant, and prosecution (or plaintiff, for a Civil case) are all given gender neutral names to prevent gender based arguments from being brought up in the final arguments.

The National High School Mock Trial Championship began in 1984. This first competition consisted of teams from Illinois, Iowa, Minnesota, Nebraska, and Wisconsin. The competition since has grown and now is considered to be an All-State tournament. Each year, various participating states around the country take turns hosting the tournament. There are only three teams in the tournament's history that have won the competition consecutive times: Family Christian Academy Homeschoolers from Tennessee (now CSTHEA) in the years 2002–2003, Jonesboro High School from Georgia in the years 2007–2008, and Albuquerque Academy from New Mexico in the years 2012–2013. The 2011 Championship was held in Phoenix, Arizona. Albuquerque, New Mexico hosted in 2012; Indianapolis, Indiana hosted in 2013; Madison, Wisconsin hosted in 2014; and Raleigh, North Carolina hosted in 2015. The 2016 competition was held in Boise, Idaho. Hartford, Connecticut hosted in 2017; Reno, Nevada hosted in 2018. The 2019 National High School Mock Trial Competition was held in Athens, Georgia. New York State does not participate in the national competition; rather, it has its own intrastate competition consisting of over 350 teams throughout the state. It follows similar rules to that of the national competition. New York has three levels of play, county competition, regional competition, and the finals, which is held in Albany, New York in May. Before 2021, the state of Maryland did not compete in the National High School Mock Trial Championship, and had their own statewide mock trial competition similar to that of New York; it did compete in the national competition for the first time in 2021, and was crowned champion. New Jersey and North Carolina both pulled out of the NHSMTC competition following the 2005 season due to a refusal by the organization to accommodate an Orthodox Jewish team, Torah Academy of Bergen County, that had won New Jersey's state championship. Both states rejoined in 2010 after their concerns regarding accommodation had been addressed.

Each state has its own case every year that is different from the national case. This means that the winners of each state competition, who move on to nationals, must study and prepare a completely different case in time for the National High School Mock Trial Championship in May. The national competition is governed by National Mock Trial Championship, Inc.

College
Inter-collegiate mock trial is governed by the American Mock Trial Association or AMTA.  This organization was founded in 1985 by Richard Calkins, the dean of the Drake University Law School.  AMTA sponsors regional and national-level competitions, writes and distributes case packets and rules, and keeps a registry of mock trial competitors and alumni. The case packet is generally written and distributed prior to the scholastic year in August, and case changes are made throughout the season, usually in September, December, and finally in February after Regional competitions and prior to the Opening Round of Championships. Since 2015, AMTA has released a new case to be used for the National Championship following the completion of the Opening Round of Championships. Approximately 700 teams from over 400 universities and colleges will compete in AMTA tournaments.  In total, AMTA provides a forum for over 7,300 undergraduate students each academic year to engage in intercollegiate mock trial competitions across the country.

On the inter-collegiate circuit, a mock trial team consists of three attorneys and three witnesses on each side of the case (plaintiff/prosecution and defense). The attorneys are responsible for delivering an opening statement, conducting direct and cross examinations of witnesses and delivering closing arguments. Witnesses are selected in a sports draft format from a pool of approximately eight to 10 available witnesses prior to the round. Typical draft orders are DPDPDP, PPPDDD, or DDPPPD but this may vary substantially between cases. Witnesses may be available only to the plaintiff/prosecution, only to the defense, or to both sides of the case. Witnesses consist of both experts as well as lay witnesses. Judges are usually attorneys, coaches, law school students, and in some occasions, practicing judges.

All collegiate mock trial cases take place in the fictional state of Midlands, USA. Midlands is not geographically situated and falls under the protection of the United States Constitution.

Tournament competition
A tournament consists of four rounds, two on each side of the case, typically scored by two to three judges in each round. The season runs in two parts: the invitational season and the regular season. Invitational tournaments are held throughout the fall semester and into early spring across the country. At invitationals, teams have the opportunity to test out particular case theories and improve as competitors before facing the challenge and pressure of regular season competition.

The regular season begins in late January, starting with regional tournaments. There are typically more than 600 teams spread across 24 regional tournaments. Each school is limited to two post-regional bids to the "Opening Round Championship Series." 192 teams advance to the Opening Round Championship, which is held at eight different tournament sites. The top teams at each Opening Round Championship Tournament qualify for a berth in the National Championship Tournament. There are 48 total bids to the final tournament. Previously, teams could earn up to two bids to either the National Championship Tournament (gold flight) or a National Tournament (silver flight) based on performance at Regionals. The two National Tournaments, which were held in March, consisted of 48 teams each, with the top 6 teams at each National earning a second-chance bid to the National Championship Tournament, which was held in April. The direct bid system was replaced by the current ORCS system in 2008.

For 22 years, the National Championship Tournament was held in Des Moines, Iowa, the city in which collegiate mock trial began. The tournament left Iowa for the first time in 2007 when Stetson University in St. Petersburg, Florida hosted the Championship. The 2008 National Championship Tournament was held in Minneapolis, Minnesota. Between 2009–2011, the Championship returned to Des Moines in odd-numbered years, while even-numbered years featured a different venue. The 2010 Championship was hosted by Rhodes College at courthouses in downtown Memphis, Tennessee, while the 2012 Championship was held in Minneapolis.  Beginning in 2013, future Championships will be awarded solely on a competitive bidding process, although Des Moines, if it bids, will be given preference during "landmark" years, such as anniversaries of AMTA's founding in 1985.  The 2013 Championship was held in Washington, D.C. with the University of Virginia handling hosting duties.  The 2014 Championship was held in Orlando, Florida at the Orange County Courthouse, with the University of Central Florida serving as the host institution. The 2015 Championship was hosted by the University of Cincinnati, with trials held at the Hamilton County Courthouse in Cincinnati. The 2016 Championship was hosted by Furman University in Greenville, South Carolina. In 2017, the Championship tournament was hosted by the University of California, Los Angeles in the Los Angeles County Superior Court (Stanley Mosk Courthouse) in downtown LA. In 2018, the Championship was hosted by Hamline University in Minneapolis, Minnesota.

Past championship results
In 2006, the University of Virginia beat Harvard University to win the National Championship. The University of Virginia won the championship by a single point using a tiebreaker, after a three judge panel split with one judge choosing Virginia as the winner, one choosing Harvard, and one calling the round a draw. The University of Virginia's victory ended the then-recent run by UCLA, which had won the two previous national championships.

In 2007, the University of Virginia again defeated Harvard University. This marked the first ever re-match of a previous year's final round. Virginia again won via a split decision, winning two of the three ballots in the final round. Virginia also became the 4th school to repeat as champions, joining UCLA, the University of Iowa, and Rhodes College, which accomplished the feat twice. Harvard University became the second program to finish as runner up in consecutive years, joining the University of Maryland, College Park. Maryland, however, had the distinction of losing to themselves in one of those two defeats.

In 2008, the University of Maryland prevailed over the George Washington University in a split-ballot decision (2–1). This was Maryland's fifth title, giving them more total wins than any other university in AMTA history.

In 2009, Northwood University defeated George Washington University 5–0 to claim its first National Championship.

In 2010, New York University defeated Harvard University 3–1–1 to win its first National Championship. This was Harvard's third championship round appearance in the last five years following its consecutive losses to Virginia.

In 2011, UCLA defeated defending champion New York University 4–1 to claim the Bruins' third title, the third-most in the history of the American Mock Trial Association.

In 2012, Duke defeated Rutgers 2–1, in what was the first championship round appearance for both squads.

In 2013, Florida State University defeated Rhodes College in FSU's first championship round appearance by a 4–1 ballot decision. This was Rhodes' eighth championship round appearance to date.  2013 also marked the first year that the National Championship Tournament had 3 scoring judges per round (instead of 2).

In 2014, UCLA defeated Princeton University in a 3–2 ballot decision. With this victory, UCLA tied Rhodes for the second-highest record of championships (4 wins), behind University of Maryland, College Park (5 wins). This round was also Princeton's first championship round appearance.

In 2015, Harvard defeated Yale in a 4-0–1 ballot decision. This marked Harvard's first championship win, despite having been the runner-up 3 times previously (in 2006, 2007, and 2010).  2015 also marked Yale's first championship round appearance. Finally, 2015 marked the first year that the case problem for the National Championship Tournament was different from the case schools had been using in competition for the earlier elimination rounds. (I.e. In the past colleges had argued the same case all year long, but starting in 2015 any team that qualified for the championship tournament was given a brand new case to learn and argue in the span of just a few weeks.)

In 2016, Yale won its first national championship in an 11–3–1 ballot decision, defeating the University of Virginia in the final trial. Yale is one of only nine schools to have competed in the final trial of the National Championship Tournament two years in a row.  2016 also marked the first year that the National Championship Tournament had 5 scoring judges per round, and 15 scoring judges in the final championship round.

In 2017, Virginia defeated Yale in a 6–1 ballot decision in a rematch of the 2016 final. Yale's appearance marked the first time in collegiate championship history the same school has appeared three consecutive times in the final championship round.

In 2018, Miami University of Ohio defeated Yale in a 4–3 ballot decision. This was Miami's second championship, the first having been in 2001. Yale extended its record of consecutive championship round appearances to 4, having been the champion in 2016 and the runner-up in 2017 and 2015.

In 2019, Yale University defeated Rhodes College in a 5–2 ballot decision. The decision was then vacated by the governing body, after an investigation concluded that Yale had violated tournament rules. Therefore, no winner was declared.

In 2020, the national championship (as well as several preliminary qualifier tournaments) was canceled due to the COVID-19 pandemic. In 2021, due to the ongoing pandemic, the national championship took place entirely remotely via video calls. In what was the closest final round in AMTA history, the University of Maryland, Baltimore County beat Yale when the panel of 11 judges was split 5–5 (with one tie), resulting in a narrow tiebreaker.

In 2022, Harvard University defeated the University of Chicago in a 3–2 ballot decision. This marked Harvard's second championship title and Chicago's first-ever appearance in a championship round.

The following is the list of winners of the National Championship Tournament, as well as the runners-up:

†The 2021 National Championship Tournament was held online due to the COVID-19 Pandemic.

‡The 2020 National Championship Tournament was cancelled due to the COVID-19 Pandemic.

*From 1992 until 2010, the "Maryland Rule" was in effect, which placed both teams from the same school in the same division in order to ensure there wouldn't be another championship round between two teams from the same school. The Maryland Rule was repealed before the 2010–11 season.

National Championship Round Participants

*Yale also participated in the Championship Round in 2019, and won the initial judges' decision, but was later stripped of its title for violating tournament rules.

Trial by Combat
Beginning in 2018, Trial by Combat (TBC) has existed as an AMTA-adjacent mock trial competition. The tournament is held after the end of the competitive season (marked by the conclusion of the final round of the National Championship), typically in late June. It is currently co-hosted by the Drexel University Thomas R. Kline School of Law and the UCLA School of Law. The tournament "aims to celebrate the best individual college competitors in the country—and identify the very best".

The format of Trial by Combat is markedly different from official AMTA tournaments. Rather than a successive narrowing of a field of teams throughout a competitive season, individual competitors submit applications to take part in the tournament, and the top 16 applicants are selected to compete. The competitors are chosen based on their respective school's caliber of competition, the number of awards received at tournaments, appearances at ORCS and Nationals, amongst other factors. The selected competitors then receive the case materials on the morning of the first day of the competition, and have 24 hours to prepare. Each trial has one attorney and one witness per side. During the four preliminary rounds, each competitor performs each role once. Instead of the typical 1 to 10 scale for judging each performance, judges award a check mark to the competitor whose performance they preferred for each category. The four top-ranked students then proceed to Semifinals. The winning competitors of Semifinals compete as attorneys in the Championship Trial. The winner of the Championship Trial receives a full-size sword as their prize.

The following is a list of Trial by Combat winners, the runners-ups, and the university they represented:

*The 2020 and 2021 Trial by Combat Tournaments were held as online competitions due to the COVID-19 Pandemic.

Forums and social media
Social media and forums have allowed competitors to communicate and share information and opinions. Some mock trial teams have created forums for themselves on Facebook, and spoofs of characters from various cases have  made their way onto Facebook with their own profiles.  Two collegiate mock trial alumni, Ben Garmoe and Drew Evans, created a podcast on the subject, entitled The Mock Review. The American Mock Trial Association has a Twitter feed which provides updates on procedures and tournament results.

The most prolific presence of collegiate mock trial on the internet was the web forum, Perjuries , the national online mock trial community. On Perjuries, mock trial competitors, coaches, and alumni could create user accounts and discuss a wide range of related topics. The site had approximately 5,000 registered users, 2,000 discussions, and 88,000 posts.
The Perjuries forum is now defunct. Many of the posts from the forum have been archived on the replacement website, Impeachments.

Law school
In the United States, law schools participate in interscholastic mock trial/trial advocacy. Teams typically consist of several "attorneys" and several "witnesses" on each side. A round consists of two law students acting as "attorneys" for each side.

The trial typically, although not always, begins with motions in limine and housekeeping matters, then moves through opening statements, witness testimony (both direct examination and cross examination), and finishes with a closing argument, sometimes called a summation. Throughout the trial, rules of evidence apply, typically the Federal Rules of Evidence, and objections are made applying these rules.

Every team in a tournament is given the same "problem" or "case", typically several months in advance, but for some tournaments only a few weeks ahead of the tournament's start. The problems can be criminal or civil, which affects many procedural aspects of the trial, for instance the increased rights of a criminal defendant not to testify against himself. The cases are written in an attempt to create an equal chance of either side prevailing, since the main objective is not to identify the winner of the case, but rather the team with superior advocacy skills.

Occasionally the winners of mock trial tournaments receive special awards such as money or invitations to special events, but the status of winning a tournament is significant in and of itself.

In addition, a university may require a mock trial course or courses as a requirement for graduation; among such universities is Baylor Law School, whose third-year Practice Court courses are mandatory for all students and have been since the school's reopening in the 1920s.

Mock Trial Competitions*:
Georgetown White Collar Crime Invitational Mock Trial Competition, American Association for Justice Student Trial Advocacy Competition (formerly ATLA)
National Civil Trial Competition, Texas Young Lawyers Association/National Trial Competition Mock Trial Competition (NTC), Michigan State University National Trial Advocacy Competition (NTAC), California Association of Criminal Justice (CACJ) Mock Trial Competition, Capitol City Challenge, National Ethics Trial Competition at Pacific McGeorge School of Law, Lone Star Classic National Mock Trial Tournament

The following is the list of winners of the National Trial Competition (NTC):

In arts, entertainment, and media
 Mock Trial is a 1910 card game developed by Lizzie Magie.
 In an episode of the American television series The Fugitive, a once-famed attorney and current law professor named G. Stanley Lazer claims that he could reverse Richard Kimble's criminal conviction if the case went back to trial. To Kimble's chagrin, Lazer decides to prove his theory by conducting a mock trial with his students playing the prosecutor, defense lawyer, and jury in front of a live TV audience.
 In an episode of the American television show Suits, Mike Ross, an employee of one of New York's top law firms, goes head-to-head with one of his co-workers in a mock trial.
 In the American television series Shark, the protagonist had a room on his house specially designed like a courtroom to make Mock trials before important cases. It was used in a couple of episodes.
 In the season 1 episode "Mock" of the American television show The Good Wife, Will Gardner, a partner at Lockhart Gardner, presides as a judge over a law school mock trial. Additionally, in the season 4 episode "Red Team, Blue Team", Alicia and Cary, employees of Lockhart & Gardner, go head-to-head with their co-workers, Will and Diane, in a mock trial. Season 6 episode "Loser Edit" also featured a mock trial involving Diane as a prosecutor.
 In an episode of Arrested Development, Judge Reinhold has a courtroom TV show called Mock Trial with J. Reinhold, in which he is a fake Judge and the Bluth family uses it as a trial run for their legal defense against the SEC.
 In Phoenix Wright: Ace Attorney: Dual Destinies (Gyakuten Saiban 5 in Japan), there is a case called "Turnabout Academy" in which a mock trial ends up becoming an actual trial. The teacher that decided which script was going to be used for the mock trial was found dead after the mock trial. Juniper Woods was accused of murdering her teacher, but her friend, Athena Cykes, decided to defend her old friend in court.

See also

 Kangaroo court
 Model United Nations

References

External links
 
 collegmocktrial.org
 "Perjuries.com Mock Trial Forums" Online community forum discussing mock trial related topics.
 "International Online Mock Trial Competition" Mock Trial Online Competition hosted by practicing litigators.
 "Young Lawyers Division Statewide Mock Trial Competition" Pennsylvania Mock Trial. Pennsylvania Bar Association.
 "Florida High School Mock Trial." Florida Law Related Education. 2005. Florida Law Education Association, Inc. 4 Oct. 2006.
 "Mock Trial Competition." Constitutional Rights Foundation. 2006. Constitutional Rights Foundation. 4 Oct. 2006.
 "Mock Trials." Legal Explorer. 2006. State Bar of Wisconsin. 4 Oct. 2006.
 "Mock Trial Tournament." New York State Bar Association. 4 Oct. 2006. New York State Bar Association. 4 Oct. 2006.
 "Rules of the Competition." National High School Mock Trial Championship. 2006. National High School Mock Trial Championship, Inc. 4 Oct. 2006.
 "Tennessee State High School Mock Trial Competition." TBAlink. 2006. Tennessee Bar Association. 10 Oct. 2006.
 "Free Trial Advocacy Tips for Trial Lawyers" Winning Trial Advocacy Techniques blog
 "Massachusetts High School Mock Trial" Massachusetts Bar Association. 2007. Massachusetts Bar Association. 20 Feb 2007.
 "Ohio Mock Trial Ohio Mock Trial
 "Free Closing Argument Video" Mock Trial University, 2012

Legal education
Legal research
Types of trials